Lucky Charm is the eighth studio album by Australian rock act The Black Sorrows.  Previously a band with a set line-up, for this album lead singer Joe Camilleri was the only constant from track to track, as he worked with 42 other musicians on the album.

Lucky Charm was released on 4 November 1994. The album debuted and peaked at number 20 on the ARIA Charts, becoming the band's fifth consecutive top twenty album.

Track listing
CD track listing (478280 2)

Weekly charts

Personnel
Joe Camilleri  –  vocals, guitars (1,5,9,13,14), saxophone (2,4), accordion (7), vibes (9)
with:
Kerryn Tolhurst  – guitars (1,2,3,10), banjo (3), tiple (4,6,7,8,10,12), mandolin (4,7,11) lap steel (12), Hawaiian guitar (8,11)
Andy York – guitars (1,3,6,7,8,11)
Claude Carranza – guitars (2,4,9,10,12), dobro (9)
Stuart Fraser – guitar (4)
Shane O'Mara – guitars (5,14), dobro (5)
Phil Butson – guitar (6)
John Scurry – banjo (15)
James Black – keyboards (1)
Bob Mayo – keyboards (1,3,7)
Charlie Giordano – accordion (2,8,12), keyboards (2,4,10)
Michael Allen – sound effects keyboard (3)
John Margolis – keyboards (6,11)
David Bates – piano (15)
Robert Burke – flute and clarinet (5)
Chris Taner – clarinet (15)
Lenny Pickett – tenor saxophone (7)
Crispin Cioe – baritone saxophone (12)
Arno Hecht – tenor saxophone (12)
Vinnie Cutro – trumpet (10)
Eugene Ball – cornet (15)
Todd Reynolds – violin (2)
Eileen Ivers – fiddle (6,11)
Susan Pirotti – strings (14)
Rosanne Hunt – strings (14)
Julia De Jonghe – strings (14)
Karen Coulton – strings (14)
Steven Hadley – bass (1,2,3,4,6,7,8,10,11,12)
Joe Creighton – bass (9)
Howard Cairns – double bass (15)
Steve Ferrone – drums (1,2,3,4,6,7,8,10,11,12)
John Watson – drums (9)
Allan Browne – drums (15)
Jon Stevens - co-lead vocal (4)
Rebecca Barnard – backing vocals (1,5,14)
Gordon Dukes – backing vocals (2)
Ron Grant – backing vocals (2,4)
Wayne Hernandez – backing vocals (2,4)
Kenny Simpson – backing vocals (4)
Nick Smith – backing vocals (6)
Joey Diggs – backing vocals (7)
Lamont Van Hook – backing vocals (7)
Johnny Rosch – backing vocals (7)

References

External links
 "Lucky Charm" at discogs.com

1994 albums
The Black Sorrows albums
Columbia Records albums
Albums produced by Joe Camilleri